The Poso Riots, also known as Poso Communal Conflict, is a name given to a series of riots that occurred in Poso, Central Sulawesi, Indonesia. This incident involved a group of Muslim and Christian in the region and is divided into three stages. The first Poso riot took place from December 25 to 29, 1998, continued from April 17 to 21, 2000, and finally from May 16 to June 15, 2000.

On December 20, 2001, the Malino I Declaration was signed between the two conflicting parties, initiated by Jusuf Kalla, officially concluding the conflict.

Background 
Central Sulawesi is a mountainous province situated between the southern part and the northern part of Sulawesi Island, including many islands nearby. Poso Regency is one of eight other regencies established only after 2002 within the province. The capital of Poso Regency, Poso, is located in the bay, six hours southeast of the provincial capital, Palu. Currently, Poso Regency has a Muslim majority population in towns and coastal villages, and the majority of Protestant indigenous people in the highlands. Historically, in addition to the native Muslim population, there are many migrants of Bugis people from South Sulawesi, as well as from the northern Gorontalo region. There is also a long tradition of Arab traders living in the region, and their descendants play an important role in religious institutions and Islamic education in the area.

The regency is also a focus of the government's transmigration program, which aimed at bringing citizens from densely populated areas, such as Muslim-dominated islands including Java and Lombok, as well as Hindu-dominated Balinese islands, to scarcely populated areas. The Muslim community here consists of indigenous people, official transmigrants, and economic migrants of various ethnic groups which have settled in this area for decades. Under these circumstances, in the late 1990s, the Muslim population became the majority in Poso Regency with percentages above 60 percent.

On the other hand, ethno-linguistic groups that include Pamona, Mori, To Napu, Behoa and Bada inhabit the highlands of the regency. Many of these ethnic groups were formerly constituted dynasties and have histories of war between each others. The missionary activity of Netherlands began at the turn of the 20th century among these people, effectively proliferated Christianity. The city of Tentena became the economic and spiritual center for the Protestant population of Poso, and the center of the synod of the Central Sulawesi Christian Church. This small town lies to the north of Lake Poso in North Pamona Sub-Regency, one of the few sub-regencies with the majority population of Pamona people.

Although the initial conflict centered on tensions between Muslim Bugis migrants and Protestant Pamona people, many other groups were drawn through their ethnic, cultural, or economic ties.

Effects 
With the growing wave of violence, people fled to areas with the majority population of their religion. The Muslims went to Palu, Poso, and the coastal city of Parigi, while Christians in Parigi fled to Tentena and Napu which is located in the mountains, or Manado, in North Sulawesi. In January 2002, after the Malino I Declaration was signed, official figures for coordination with the humanitarian responses to the conflict estimated a total of 86,000 internal refugees emerged in Central Sulawesi. Central Sulawesi Christian Church estimates 42,000 refugees in the Christian-dominated area in other regencies.

After the Malino I Declaration, there were some tentative progress. By the end of February, 10,000 refugees had returned home, mostly to the city of Poso, the sub-regency of Poso Pesisir, Lage and Tojo. In March 2002, Human Rights Watch found that many families were hesitantly sending male family members back and clearing the debris by building temporary houses, while waiting to see if the situation remained stable. Some were also waiting for the end of the school year. Since then the number of refugees has begun to decline, and diminishing slowly. The Poso Regency Police and Political Affairs Office reported that in mid-July 2002, 43,308 people had returned home, some 40 percent of the estimated total 110,227 refugees.

There are two notable exceptions to this positive trend. New violence often makes traumatized citizens return fleeing to safe havens. For example, clashes in August 2002 forced about 1,200 people to seek refuge in Tentena. Government or individual efforts of rebuilding have been hampered by new waves of violence throughout the crisis. Some people told Human Rights Watch that they had seen their homes destroyed more than once, and the barracks built by the local government and Indonesian army in 2000 were often targeted by these attacks. Christians in Tentena also have no plans to dismantle their shelter which is painstakingly built, in case of the need of the shelter in the future.

Other important exceptions are regarding the refugees belonging to minorities in their home regions. Muslim refugees from Tentena told Human Rights Watch in Palu that they had no plans to return home, although the remaining twenty-four Muslims who never left Tentena reported that their situation was safe.

Some refugees were given access to land in their new areas, such as Nunu area of Palu, and were able to support themselves through agricultural activities. Christian refugees in Tentena built large housing and are able to find jobs in the urban market, which is economically positive because of means to travel to other markets being limited. In areas where land or work is scarce, conditions are much more poor.

A local NGO reported in August 2002 that the basic needs of refugees were not met, creating problems such as the lack of nutrition for children, widespread diarrhea, skin disease and tetanus from shot wounds. In a mental health assessment by the government in 2001, it indicates that more than 55 percent of those displaced suffer from psychological problems, while major health problems are malaria, respiratory problems, gastric – intestine, and skin diseases.

See also 
 2000 Walisongo school massacre
 2002 Poso bus attacks
 2004 Poso bus bombing
 2005 Indonesian beheadings of Christian girls
 2005 Tentena market bombings

References

Citations

Sources

Bibliography 

 
 
 
 
 
 
 
 
 
 
 
 
 
 
 
 
 
 

20th-century conflicts
21st-century conflicts
History of Central Sulawesi
Christian–Islamic violence
Ethnic conflicts in Indonesia
Military history of Indonesia
Wars involving Indonesia
New Order (Indonesia)
Post-Suharto era
Religiously motivated violence in Indonesia